Kristianstad FC is a Swedish football club located in Kristianstad. The club was formed in 2015 through a merger between Kristianstads FF and Kristianstad BoIS. The club is currently playing in Division 2, the fourth tier of Swedish football.

History
Kristianstads FF was founded in 1990, when the football section of IFK Kristianstad merged with Vilans BoIF. The club then began life in Division 3 Sydöstra Götaland, which was the fourth tier of Swedish football. In the first few seasons Kristianstads FF finished in mid-table positions but then won promotion at the end of the 1993 season after finishing top of the Division 3 Sydöstra Götaland.

The club established themselves in Division 2 Södra Götaland over the next four seasons before winning the division in 1998. There followed one season in Division 1 Södra in 1999 where the club finished in ninth position and were most unfortunate to be relegated at the end of the campaign as a result of league re-structuring. The club's confidence dipped in Division 2 Södra Götaland and a further relegation followed at the end of the 2001 season.

However the club were promoted from Division 3 Sydöstra Götaland in 2002 after finishing in second place. Over the rest of the decade the club has played in Division 1 Södra and Division 2 Södra Götaland where they currently reside.

The club is affiliated to the Skånes Fotbollförbund.

Players

First-team squad

Current youth players with first-team experience

Out on loan

Season to season

Managers
 Joakim Persson (Nov 4, 2015 – Sep 22, 2017)
 Atli Eðvaldsson (Sep 22, 2017 – Jan 15, 2018)
 Serdar Dayat (Jan 15, 2018 – May 22, 2018)
 Besnik Llazani (May 22, 2018 – May 2, 2019)
 Joacim Velander (May 2, 2019 – October 17, 2019)
 Pierre Ferreira (October 17, 2019 – November 27, 2019)
 Jack Majgaard Jensen (November 27, 2019 – December 13, 2019)
 Anders Swahn (January 9, 2020 – November 18, 2020)
 Mladen Blagojevic (November 18, 2020 – )

Footnotes

References

External links
 Official site 
 SvFF page 

Kristianstad FC
Football clubs in Skåne County
Sport in Kristianstad Municipality
Association football clubs established in 1990
1990 establishments in Sweden
Association football clubs established in 2015
2015 establishments in Sweden